Takhir Mamashayev (born September 24, 1979 in Zhambyl) is a Kazakhstani marathon runner. He set a personal best time of 2:15:20 at the 2003 Berlin Marathon.

Mamashayev represented Kazakhstan at the 2008 Summer Olympics in Beijing, where he competed for the men's marathon. He successfully finished the race in seventieth place by nineteen seconds behind Israel's Seteng Ayele, with a time of 2:30:26.

References

External links

NBC 2008 Olympics profile

Kazakhstani male marathon runners
Living people
Olympic athletes of Kazakhstan
Athletes (track and field) at the 2008 Summer Olympics
1979 births